Zázrivá is a village and municipality in Dolný Kubín District in the Žilina Region of northern Slovakia. It is located in the Orava region, around 35 km from Žilina and 20 km from Dolný Kubín. It was first mentioned in 1556.

Etymology
The name means 'envied' (i.e., a village envied by others).

References

External links
 Zázrivá village website (in Slovak and English)

Villages and municipalities in Dolný Kubín District